Edwurd Fudwupper Fibbed Big is a 2000 film starring Emily Osment. The film also stars Justin Brinsfield, John Cleese, Frances McDormand, Jonathan Winters, Catherine O'Hara, Harry Shearer and Haley Joel Osment. It is based on the book by Berkeley Breathed. It was shown in front of Rugrats in Paris: The Movie in select theaters.

Cast
 Haley Joel Osment as Edwurd Fudwupper 
 Frances McDormand as The adult Fannie (narrator)
 Emily Osment as The child Fannie
 John Cleese as The giant alien
 Jonathan Winters as the president (live action footage)
 Catherine O'Hara as Lorna Mae Loon 
 Harry Shearer as the general 
 Justin Brinsfield as Mabel Dill

External links

2000s animated short films
2000s American animated films
2000 animated films
2000 films
American animated short films
Adaptations of works by Berkeley Breathed
Works by Berkeley Breathed
Nickelodeon Movies films
Paramount Pictures short films
2000s English-language films